Atkins is a city in Pope County, Arkansas, United States. The population was 3,016 at the 2010 census. It is part of the Russellville Micropolitan Statistical Area.

Geography
Atkins is located at  (35.243485, -92.938212).

Many Atkins residents commute to nearby Russellville for work, school, and recreation.

History
The town is named after Elisha Atkins, a Boston sugar importer who financed the Little Rock and Fort Smith Railroad which spawned the growth of the town after the Civil War. It was formally platted in 1872. Atkins built its first school in 1875 and boasted its own newspaper, the Atkins Chronicle in 1894. The town served as a local cotton depot with a number of cotton gins operating in town. The 1927 flooding of the Arkansas River damaged the town and subsequent road buildings gradually shifted the town to orient northwards away from the river.

Atkins was the site of the Goldsmith Pickle Company which started producing pickled cucumbers in 1946. The town thus laid claim to be the “Pickle Capital of the World” with some 1200 acres devoted to growing cucumbers. Along the same line Atkins was the original home of the fried dill pickle, created by Bernell “Fatman” Austin. The pickle plant came under owners through the years until 2002 when the plant shuttered but left the town with the two-day "Picklefest" legacy held each May.

Demographics

2020 census

As of the 2020 United States census, there were 2,859 people, 1,164 households, and 759 families residing in the city.

2010 census
As of the census of 2010, there were 3,016 people in 1,118 households, including 849 families, in the city. The racial makeup of the city was 95.6% White, 0.9% Black or African American, 0.8% Native American, 0.1% Asian, 1.2% from other races, and 1.2% from two or more races. 2.3% of the population were Hispanic or Latino of any race.

Of the 1,118 households 30.4% had children under the age of 18 living with them, 53% were married couples living together, 12.1% had a female householder with no husband present, and 28.4% were non-families. 25.3% of households were one person and 11.2% were one person aged 65 or older.  The average household size was 2.50 and the average family size was 2.95.

The age distribution was 23.4% under the age of 18, 9.4% from 18 to 24, 25% from 25 to 44, 24.5% from 45 to 64, and 17.7% 65 or older. The median age was 38.8 years. For every 100 females, there were 90.4 males. For every 100 females age 18 and over, there were 90.7 males.

The median household income was $40,112 and the median family income  was $49,754. Males had a median income of $33,191 versus $38,833 for females. The per capita income for the city was $18,605. About 6.4% of families and 8.8% of the population were below the poverty line, including 6.3% of those under age 18 and 7.9% of those age 65 or over.

Notable people
 Ellis Kinder, major league baseball pitcher; Atkins native
 Wilson Matthews, former University of Arkansas assistant football coach; Atkins native
 Norris Church Mailer, writer, wife of Norman Mailer

References

External links

Cities in Arkansas
Cities in Pope County, Arkansas
Russellville, Arkansas micropolitan area
Populated places established in 1872
1872 establishments in Arkansas